Orthocarpus bracteosus is a species of flowering plant in the broomrape family known by the common name rosy owl's-clover. It is native to western North America from British Columbia to northern California, where it grows in moist mountain habitat, such as meadows.

Description
The inflorescence is a hairy, densely glandular spike of flowers. It is club-shaped with a pouchlike lower lip and a narrow, hooked upper lip.

External links
Jepson Manual Treatment: Orthocarpus bracteosus
USDA Plants Profile
Orthocarpus bracteosus Photo gallery

Orobanchaceae
Flora of the Western United States
Flora of California
Flora of Canada
Flora of North America
Flora without expected TNC conservation status